Louise Baxter (née Munn, born 30 September 1983) is a female field hockey defender from Scotland, who also plays on midfield. She has made 114 appearances for the Women's National Team.

She was born 8 in Newport-on-Tay, attending Bell Baxter High School in Cupar, Fife. She made her debut for the Women's National Team in 2003. She played in two Commonwealth Games tournaments: Melbourne and Dehli. She retired from international competitions in 2011 after deciding to concentrate on her career in Physical education. She has played club hockey for Bell Baxter FP, Dunfermline Ladies, Grange Edinburgh, Bonagrass Grove and Grove Menzieshill.

Baxter taught physical education at St George's School in Edinburgh before taking up the post of Head of Physical Education at Kilgraston School, Perthshire in 2010. She then moved to High School of Dundee teaching physical education, as well as having a guidance role.

References

External links
 
 

1983 births
Living people
Scottish female field hockey players
Field hockey players at the 2006 Commonwealth Games
Field hockey players at the 2010 Commonwealth Games
People from Newport-on-Tay
Commonwealth Games competitors for Scotland